Aurora Dan (born 5 October 1955) is a Romanian fencer. She won a silver medal in the women's team foil event at the 1984 Summer Olympics.

References

1955 births
Living people
Romanian female fencers
Romanian foil fencers
Olympic fencers of Romania
Fencers at the 1980 Summer Olympics
Fencers at the 1984 Summer Olympics
Olympic silver medalists for Romania
Olympic medalists in fencing
Sportspeople from Bucharest
Medalists at the 1984 Summer Olympics
Universiade medalists in fencing
Universiade silver medalists for Romania
Medalists at the 1981 Summer Universiade